Luminus can refer to:

 Luminus (company), Belgian electricity and natural gas company

 Luminus (comics), a super-villain of Superman